The Jasik Debugger (or more correctly, The Debugger from Jasik Designs), was a debugger tool for the classic Mac OS. Pitched as a much more powerful alternative to Macsbug, it was a popular choice among professional Mac developers until the advent of more advanced source-level debuggers such as that built into Metrowerks Codewarrior.

While Jasik's debugger featured a graphical user interface, it was laid out in a very arbitrary and peculiar way, with buttons seemingly randomly sized and positioned. This gave it a reputation as difficult to use.

References 
 Jasik Designs page describing debugger features

Macintosh operating systems development
Debuggers
Discontinued development tools
Classic Mac OS programming tools